Ironhide may refer to:

 Ironhide, a fictional character from the Transformers science fiction robot media franchise; see List of The Transformers (TV series) characters
 The Transformers: Ironhide, a comic book published by IDW from the Transformers science fiction robot media franchise
 Ironhide Game Studio, a videogame studio software company
 Grimgor Ironhide, a fictional character from the Warhammer fantasy media franchise

See also

 Armor
 Ironclad
 Iron armour
 Ironside (disambiguation)
 Iron (disambiguation)
 Hide (disambiguation)